National Highway 128 (NH 128) is a  National Highway in India. This highway runs entirely in the state of Uttar Pradesh.

References

National highways in India
Raebareli district